Silje Øyre Slind (born 9 February 1988) is a Norwegian cross-country skier.

She made her World Cup debut in the 2011–12 season opener at Sjusjøen, finishing 32nd. She collected several World Cup points in the 2014–15 season, recording sixth and eight places in Rybinsk in January 2015. She once again broke the top-ten barrier in December 2015, finishing seventh in the Lillehammer sprint. In February 2017 she made her first podiums, in Pyeongchang where she finished second in the sprint and team sprint.

She also competed at the 2013 Winter Universiade, recording a sixth place (relay) and a seventh place.

She represented the sports clubs Oppdal IL. She is the twin sister of Astrid Øyre Slind and older sister of Kari Øyre Slind.

Cross-country skiing results
All results are sourced from the International Ski Federation (FIS).

World Cup

Season standings

Individual podiums
1 podium – (1 )

Team podiums
 1 podium – (1 )

References 

1988 births
Living people
People from Oppdal
Norwegian female cross-country skiers
Norwegian twins
Twin sportspeople
Sportspeople from Trøndelag